The women's 1500 metres at the 2007 World Championships in Athletics was held at the Nagai Stadium on 29, 31 August and 2 September.

Medalists

Note. The silver medal was originally won by Yelena Soboleva of Russia but she was eventually stripped off after being banned for manipulating drug samples..

Schedule

Results

Heats
Qualification: First 6 in each heat (Q) and the next 6 fastest (q) advance to the semifinals.

Note: Both Yuliya Fomenko and Yelena Soboleva originally advanced to the semifinals but were later retrospectively disqualified.

Semifinals
Qualification: First 5 in each semifinal (Q) and the next 2 fastest (q) advance to the final.

Note: Both Yuliya Fomenko and Yelena Soboleva originally advanced to the final but were later retrospectively disqualified.

Final

Both Yuliya Fomenko and Yelena Soboleva originally participated in the final (with Soboleva finishing in second place), but were later retrospectively disqualified due to doping offences.

References
General
1500 metres results from IAAF.
Results for 1500-metres from World Athletics.
Specific

1500 metres
1500 metres at the World Athletics Championships
2007 in women's athletics